Agony is the second studio album by technical death metal band Oppressor. It was released in 1996.

Track listing

Personnel
Oppressor
 Adam Zadel – Guitarist
 Tim King – Bassist and Vocals
 Tom Schofield – Drummer
 Jim Stopper – Guitarist

Production
 Brad Hall - Photography
 Brian Griffin - Engineering, Mixing, Producer
 Adam Zadel - Engineering assistant
 Rob Stephenson - Engineering assistant
 Jim Morris - Mastering
 Tim King - Lyrics
 SV Bell - Cover art, Logo

External links
 Oppressor at Encyclopedia Metallum
 
 Oppressor on Myspace

1996 albums
Oppressor albums